The Albatros L 84 was a German tandem two-seat, single-bay fighter sesquiplane first flown in 1931. Four of the five examples produced were built by Focke-Wulf Flugzeugbau, into which Albatros Flugzeugwerke was amalgamated in that year.

Powered by a water-cooled 490 kW (660 hp) BMW VIu 7.3Z V12 engine, the L 84 had a fabric-covered fuselage constructed of welded steel tubes, and wooden wings skinned with plywood. Its armament comprised three 7.92 mm (.312 in) machine guns, two in fixed forward-firing positions and the third ring-mounted in the aft cockpit. Only the first prototype was completed before Albatros became part of Focke-Wulf, and this was destroyed during flight testing. A second example was flown in February 1933 by Focke-Wulf under the designation L 84C, using a modified cooling system.

The Reichswehr initially ordered twelve L 84s but cancelled the order after only three had been completed. Of these, one was designated L 84E and was tested with the Rolls-Royce Kestrel IIIS engine; another, L 84F, was fitted with a fuel-injected version of the BMW VIu. At least one L 84 was delivered to China.

Variants
 L 84
 L 84C - Focke-Wulf produced version with revised cooling system
 L 84E - example with Rolls-Royce Kestrel engine
 L 84F - example with fuel-injection

Specifications (L 84)

See also

References
 Green, W. & Swanborough, G. (1994). The Complete Book of Fighters. London: Salamander Books. 
 German Aircraft between 1919–1945

Sesquiplanes
Single-engined tractor aircraft
1930s German fighter aircraft
L 084